Yōichirō, Yoichiro, Youichirou or Yohichiroh is a masculine Japanese given name.

Possible writings
Yōichirō can be written using different combinations of kanji characters. Some examples:

The characters used for "ichiro" (一郎) literally means "first son" and usually used as a suffix to a masculine name, especially for the oldest son. The "yo" part of the name can use a variety of characters, each of which will change the meaning of the name ("洋" for ocean, "陽" for sunshine, "曜" and so on).

洋一郎, "ocean, first son"
陽一郎, "sunshine, first son"
庸一郎, "common, first son"
楊一郎, "willow, first son"
耀一郎, "shine, first son"

Other combinations...

陽市朗, "sunshine, city, clear"
耀市郎, "shine, city, son"
洋一朗, "ocean, one, clear"
蓉一朗, "lotus, one, clear"

The name can also be written in hiragana よういちろう or katakana ヨウイチロウ.

Notable people with the name
 (born 1958), Japanese politician
 (1859–1925), Japanese malacologist
 (born 1990), Japanese footballer
 (born 1952), Japanese artist
 (born 1979), Japanese film director, screenwriter and actor
 (born 1936), Japanese philosopher
 (1921–2015), Japanese-born American physicist
 (born 1963), Japanese film and television director
, Japanese particle physicist
, Japanese composer, music arranger and film producer

Japanese masculine given names